Frederick of Hesse may refer to:

 Frederick, Landgrave of Hesse-Eschwege (1617–1655)
 King Frederick I of Sweden (1676–1751), Landgrave of Hesse
 Frederick II, Landgrave of Hesse (1720–1785)
 Prince Frederick of Hesse (1747–1837), Danish general, third son of Frederick II, Landgrave of Hesse
 Prince Frederik of Hesse (1771–1845), Danish general, son of Prince Charles of Hesse and nephew of previous
 Frederick William of Hesse (1820–1884), second cousin of previous, and his titular successor since 1875
 Frederick William II of Hesse (1854–1888), eldest son of the previous
 Alexander Frederick of Hesse (1863–1945), brother of the previous
 Prince Frederick Charles of Hesse (1868–1940), Landgrave of Hesse and elected King of Finland